Cannons F.C. was a football team from Gibraltar. They played in the Gibraltar Second Division and the Rock Cup.

History
Cannons FC was founded in 2008. The club spent the majority of its history as the territory's "whipping boys", often finishing at the bottom of the Gibraltar Second Division. After another disappointing season in 2015–16, only finishing ahead of new team College 1975, the club overhauled its squad, benefiting from the dissolution of rivals Pegasus, Red Imps and FC Britannia by signing numerous players from the folded sides. The turnaround of playing staff paid dividends as the side entered the New Year of the 2016–17 season in third place, eventually finishing a comfortable 4th. The team went on to lead the Second Division at the start of the winter break in the 2017–18 season, however, the expulsion of Angels allowed other teams to overtake them. Following a subsequent loss of form and lack of commitment from players, heavy defeats in the final 2 games led to a 6th place finish, below Leo who had entered the winter break with 0 points. The club folded at the end of the season.

List of seasons

Final squad

References

External links 
 

Defunct football clubs in Gibraltar
2008 establishments in Gibraltar
Association football clubs established in 2008
Association football clubs disestablished in 2018